Amata uelleburgensis is a moth of the family Erebidae. It was described by Strand in 1912. It is found in the Democratic Republic of Congo and Equatorial Guinea.

References

 Natural History Museum Lepidoptera generic names catalog

Uelleburg
Moths of Africa
Moths described in 1912